Scott Alain Alexander (born July 10, 1989) is an American professional baseball pitcher for the San Francisco Giants of Major League Baseball (MLB). He played college baseball for Pepperdine University and Sonoma State University. The Kansas City Royals selected Alexander in the sixth round of the 2010 Major League Baseball draft. Alexander made his MLB debut in 2015 with the Royals, and has also played for the Los Angeles Dodgers.

Career

Amateur career
Alexander played Little League Baseball and attended Cardinal Newman High School in Santa Rosa, California, where he was named the North Bay League player of the year as a senior. He set the school records for strikeouts in a season and a career, and led them to the league championship in 2007. 

He was drafted by the Cincinnati Reds in the 37th round of the 2007 Major League Baseball draft but did not sign, and instead attended to play college baseball for the Pepperdine Waves. He was selected to the all-West Coast Conference Freshman team in 2008 when he had a 7–4 win-loss record with a 4.95 earned run average (ERA) and struck out 106 batters. He was 4–5 with a 4.11 ERA as a sophomore, when he was used as both a starter and a reliever. Between his two seasons at Pepperdine he played for the La Crosse Loggers of the Northwoods League. After the 2009 season, he played collegiate summer baseball with the Brewster Whitecaps of the Cape Cod Baseball League.

Despite describing his time at Pepperdine as a "great experience," he chose to transfer to Sonoma State University for his junior season in order to be closer to home and his ill grandmother. With the Seawolves, he was 3–6 with a 4.50 ERA in 13 starts with 70 strikeouts and was named the fourth-best prospect in NCAA Division II by PGCrosschecker.com.

Kansas City Royals

The Kansas City Royals selected Alexander in the sixth round of the 2010 Major League Baseball draft, and he signed with the team on June 11 for a $130,000 signing bonus. He made his professional debut that season with the Idaho Falls Chukars of the Pioneer Baseball League, where he was 1–6 with a 5.73 ERA in 12 games (11 starts). He subsequently missed the entire 2011 season due to left shoulder surgery, and returned in 2012 to pitch in 10 games (six starts) for the Kane County Cougars of the Midwest League where he had a 2.55 ERA.

Alexander moved between three levels in the Royals farm system in 2013, with five games for the Lexington Legends of the South Atlantic League, 12 for the Wilmington Blue Rocks of the Carolina League, and 24 for the Northwest Arkansas Naturals of the Texas League. Overall, he was 5–1 with a 3.00 ERA and appeared exclusively out of the bullpen. He did not allow a home run all season, and had the second-most innings pitched in the minor leagues (75) without a homer. 

In 2015 he pitched in 35 games for the Naturals and 11 for the Omaha Storm Chasers of the Pacific Coast League. He finished 2–4 with a 4.52 ERA in 67 innings. He pitched for the Gigantes del Cibao of the Dominican Winter League after the season and then returned to Omaha for 2015, where he was 2–3 with a 2.56 ERA in 63 innings over 41 games. The Royals selected him as their Triple-A Pitcher of the Year.

Alexander was called up to the majors for the first time on September 1, 2015, and he made his MLB debut the following day against the Detroit Tigers. He pitched a scoreless ninth inning, retiring two batters on groundouts and then striking out Nicholas Castellanos to end the game. He pitched in six innings over four games for the Royals that season, allowing three runs on five hits with three strikeouts.

In 2016, he pitched in 22 games for Omaha and 17 for the Royals. In the minors, he was 2–0 with a 3.00 ERA in 30 innings, and in the majors he had a 3.32 ERA in 19 innings. 

He made seven more appearances in the minors in 2017 but spent most of the year with the Royals, where he was 5–4 with a 2.48 ERA in 69 innings over 58 games. He picked up his first MLB win on July 2 when he pitched two scoreless innings against the Minnesota Twins and his first save on August 22 against the Colorado Rockies.

Los Angeles Dodgers
On January 4, 2018, Alexander was traded to the Los Angeles Dodgers in a three-team trade that also sent Jake Peters to the Dodgers, Luis Avilán and Joakim Soria to the Chicago White Sox, and Trevor Oaks and Erick Mejia to the Royals. The Dodgers used Alexander as an opener on June 1 due to an injury to Clayton Kershaw. In his first season in L.A, Alexander was 2–1 with three saves as he appeared in 73 games (8th-most in the NL), allowing 27 earned runs in 66 innings for a 3.68 ERA. He appeared in four games in the postseason for the Dodgers, one in the 2018 NLDS, and three in the 2018 World Series, allowing two runs to score on one hit and two walks in 2 innings pitched.

In 2019, he pitched in 28 games for the Dodgers, with a 3–2 record and 3.63 ERA in 17.1 innings. Alexander went on the injured list on June 12 as a result of left forearm inflammation, which turned out to be a nerve issue. He underwent season-ending surgery to address the issue in September. Despite the injuries, the Dodgers inked him to a one-year, $875,000, contract following the season, to avoid arbitration. 

Alexander appeared in 13 games for the Dodgers in 2020, and was 2-0 while allowing nine hits and four earned runs for a 2.92 ERA in 12 innings. He was optioned off the active roster on September 2, and spent the remainder of the pandemic-shortened season at the Dodgers alternate training site.  

Alexander had a 2.31 ERA in 13 appearances for the Dodgers in 2021 before he was placed on the 60-day injured list on June 9, with left shoulder inflammation. The Dodgers outrighted him to the minors and removed him from the 40-man roster on November 5. Alexander rejected the outright assignment, and elected free agency.

San Francisco Giants
On May 4, 2022, Alexander signed a minor league deal with the San Francisco Giants. In 2022 with three Giants’ minor league teams he was 3–0 with a 0.66 ERA in 13.2 innings. He was selected to the major league roster on August 26 and was 0–0 with two saves and an ERA of 1.04 in 17.1 innings with one walk over 17 games. In November 2022 he signed a one-year deal with the Giants for $1.15 million.

Personal life
Alexander has Type 1 diabetes, a condition that was diagnosed during the 2016 season. He has three brothers, all of whom played baseball. His older brother, Stu was drafted by the Florida Marlins in the 29th round of the 2003 Major League Baseball draft and played in their minor league system until 2009. His younger brother, Jason, currently pitches for the Milwaukee Brewers.

References

External links

Sonoma State SeaWolves profile

1989 births
Living people
Sportspeople from Santa Rosa, California
Baseball players from California
Major League Baseball pitchers
Kansas City Royals players
Los Angeles Dodgers players
San Francisco Giants players
Pepperdine Waves baseball players
Sonoma State Seawolves baseball players
Idaho Falls Chukars players
Arizona League Royals players
Kane County Cougars players
Lexington Legends players
Wilmington Blue Rocks players
Northwest Arkansas Naturals players
Omaha Storm Chasers players
Gigantes del Cibao players
American expatriate baseball players in the Dominican Republic
Oklahoma City Dodgers players
Brewster Whitecaps players
Rancho Cucamonga Quakes players
La Crosse Loggers players
Arizona Complex League Giants players